Margarethe Jochimsen, née Müller, (14 August 1931 - 15 September 2016) was a German curator, art critic and museum director.

Life and career 
Müller studied political science and art history. In 1961 she married the politician  (1933-1999), with whom she had a daughter and a son. In 1988 she was the initiator for the rescue of the house of August Macke in Bonn; subsequently she was the founding director of the August-Macke-Haus in 1991 and headed it until 2002. Among other things she was editor of the series of publications of the association August Macke Haus.

Müller died in Freiburg im Breisgau at age 85.

Honours 
 2004: Bundesverdienstkreuz 1. Klasse.
 2017: Honour for life and work by the Bonner Kunstverein on 29 January 2017.

References

External links 
 
 Thomas Kliemann:  Nachruf auf Margarethe Jochimsen. Sie rettete das Macke Haus, general-anzeiger-bonn.de, 21 September 2016
 Gudrun von Schoenebeck: Kunstvereins-Jubiläum. Margarethe Jochimsen, Annelie Pohlen und Christina Végh reden über Kunst und Feminismus, general-anzeiger-bonn.de, 8 July 2013

German art historians
Women art historians
German curators
Officers Crosses of the Order of Merit of the Federal Republic of Germany
1931 births
2016 deaths
People from Bonn
German women curators